AirShow San Diego formerly Wings Over Gillespie is primarily an air show usually held the first weekend in June at Gillespie Field in El Cajon, California. It is conducted by the San Diego wing (Air Group One) of the Commemorative Air Force. It is a regular stop for many "warbirds" that make the airshow circuit each year, including the CAF's B-17 Flying Fortress Sentimental Journey.  In recent years the air show has shown a larger number of flying demonstrations at what was at one time a mostly static air show. The June 2016 event will not be held and will return June 2017.

Gillespie Field is also the home of the San Diego Air & Space Museum Gillespie Field Annex. Housing their restoration department and auxiliary display of their extended collection of military aircraft and Atlas ICBM missile.

References

External links 
 Air Group One of the Commemorative Air Force web site

Air shows in the United States
El Cajon, California
Aviation in California
Annual events in California
Tourist attractions in San Diego County, California